Badīʿ Al-Zaman Abu al-Qasim Hibatallah Ibn Al-Ḥusayn more commonly known as al-Badīʿ al-Asṭurlābī, was a prominent medieval Arab physician, philosopher, astronomer, and poet of the Islamic Golden Age.

Biography 
Al-Badi' al-Asturlabi birth place and date is unknown. He is recorded to have lived in Isfahan in 510 AH (1116–7 AD) and was in contact with the Christian Arab physician Ibn al-Tilmidh (1074–1165). At a later date he moved to the city of Baghdad, where most of his achievements occurred. He is mostly renowned for designing and creating astronomical instruments, astrolabes and as an astrologer. His most well known scientific achievement is his construction and description of an astrolabe that he called (al-kurah dhat al-kursi) an astrolabe which could be used for all latitudes. The only surviving work of his is a book by the name of Kitab al-'amal bil Kurah (On the use of the Spherical astrolabe).

See also 

 List of pre-modern Arab scientists and scholars

References 

1139 deaths
12th-century physicians
Physicians from the Abbasid Caliphate
12th-century Arabic poets
12th-century Arabs
Astrologers of the medieval Islamic world
Philosophers from the Abbasid Caliphate
12th-century people from the Abbasid Caliphate
Clockmakers of the medieval Islamic world